Ben Gerrard (born 15 August 1988) is an Australian actor. He is known for his role as Toby in the ABC television series Outland (2012). He also appeared as Constable Brian O'Connor in Wolf Creek 2 (2013) and as multiple characters on the sketch comedy series Open Slather (2015). Gerrard played 35 characters in the one-man show I Am My Own Wife, which debuted in 2015. In 2016, he played Molly Meldrum's transgender friend Caroline Jenkins in the two-part miniseries Molly, for which he was nominated for an AACTA Award for Best Guest or Supporting Actor in Television Drama.

Gerrard graduated from the National Institute of Dramatic Arts (NIDA) in 2006.

References

Living people
21st-century Australian male actors
Australian male stage actors
Australian male television actors
National Institute of Dramatic Art alumni
Place of birth missing (living people)
1988 births